The Jambon Government (Regering-Jambon) is the Flemish Government formed and sworn in on 2 October 2019, following the 2019 Belgian regional elections and replacing the interim Homans Government.

On 30 September 2019, just over four months after the elections, the ruling parties (New Flemish Alliance (N-VA), the Christian Democratic and Flemish party (CD&V) and the Open Flemish Liberals and Democrats (Open Vld)) announced they had agreed to form a new coalition led by Jan Jambon, to be sworn in on 2 October 2019.

The cabinet started with a small majority in the Flemish Parliament as it dropped from 89 to 70 seats since the previous election, needing 63 for a majority. It lost a further seat in April 2021 when Sihame El Kaouakibi left Open Vld and became an independent member of Parliament. The main opposition parties are far-right Vlaams Belang (VB), the Green party and the Socialist Party (sp.a).

Composition

References

Politics of Flanders